Quebracho is an Argentine 1974 film  directed by Ricardo Wullicher. It tells the story of "La Forestal," an English company extracting Quebracho trees between 1900 and 1963 in the northern province of Santa Fe. The wood and its main product, tannin, were highly coveted between 1918 and 1945 and became a focal point of political and social struggles connected with the evolution of trade unionism, as well as the emergence of the Radical Civic Union and Peronism. It is considered an iconic film of its period, if now somewhat dated.

Cast 
 Lautaro Murúa
 Juan Carlos Gené
 Héctor Alterio
 Luis Aranda

References

External links 
 

1974 films
Argentine drama films
1970s Spanish-language films
1970s Argentine films